Lithium bicarbonate (LiHCO3) is a compound of lithium, hydrogen,  carbon and oxygen.

See also
 Lithium carbonate

References

Lithium compounds
Bicarbonates